David Ostella (born October 8, 1991) is a Canadian racing driver from Maple, Ontario.

After racing in various American and Canadian karting series, Ostella made his professional racing debut in Formula BMW Americas in 2008 for Eurointernational, finishing 9th in points. In 2009 he moved to the Star Mazda Series with AIM Autosport and finished 13th in points with one podium finish. In 2010 he returned to the series with AIM and improved to 12th in points. For 2011, he signed with Jensen MotorSport to race in the Firestone Indy Lights series. Ostella finished the championship 9th overall, accruing 287 points after contesting 13 of the 14 rounds. Ostella finished a career best 4th for Jensen in the season opener on the streets of St. Petersberg. He signed with Team Moore Racing to return to Indy Lights in 2012. Ostella improved to eighth in points and captured his first series podium, a runner-up finish in the season finale at Auto Club Speedway where he also recorded the fastest lap of the race.

In 2013, David Ostella was hired by PR1/Mathasian Motorsports to drive in the 2013 12 Hours of Sebring in an LMPC car. Ostella helped the team win the race in the PC class and finish 9th overall.

David finished the 2013 season in the Ultra 94 IMSA GT3 Cup Challenge Canada with SpeedMerchants Motorsports. Taking home two wins and nine podium finishes Ostella was able to clinch the top spot in the points standings in the Platinum Cup championship. As the points champion Ostella was given his own Porsche 911 to race around the streets of his native Toronto for one year.

Motorsports career results

American open–wheel racing
(key) (Races in bold indicate pole position; races in italics indicate fastest lap)

Star Mazda Championship

Indy Lights Results

Complete WeatherTech SportsCar Championship results
(key) (Races in bold indicate pole position) (Races in italics indicate fastest lap)

† Ostella did not complete sufficient laps in order to score full points.

References

External links
David Ostella official website

1991 births
Racing drivers from Ontario
Formula BMW USA drivers
Indy Pro 2000 Championship drivers
Indy Lights drivers
People from the Regional Municipality of York
Living people
American Le Mans Series drivers
24 Hours of Daytona drivers
WeatherTech SportsCar Championship drivers
Team Moore Racing drivers
EuroInternational drivers